OneSchool Global Tasmania also known as Oakwood School is a 3-12 coeducational independent day school located in the island state of  Tasmania in Australia. It is affiliated with the Plymouth Brethren Christian Church.

The school consists of two campuses; 
  - Launceston  
  - Hobart

External links
Oakwood School website

Private primary schools in Tasmania
Private secondary schools in Tasmania